I-364 was an Imperial Japanese Navy Type D1 transport submarine. Completed and commissioned in July 1944, she served in World War II and was sunk during her first transport mission in September 1944.

Construction and commissioning

I-364 was laid down on 26 July 1943 by Mitsubishi at Kobe, Japan, with the name Submarine No. 5464. She was renamed I-364 on 20 October 1943 and provisionally attached to the Yokosuka Naval District that day. She was launched on 15 February 1944 and was completed and commissioned on 14 June 1944.

Service history

Upon commissioning, I-364 was attached formally to the Yokosuka Naval District and was assigned to Submarine Squadron 11 for workups. With her workups complete, she was reassigned to Submarine Squadron 7 on 6 September 1944. On 14 September 1944, she departed Yokosuka bound for Wake Island on her first transport mission, expecting to reach Wake in late September.

Sea Devil began to track I-364, and Sea Devil′s commanding officer observed a large Rising Sun insignia painted on I-364′s conning tower and misidentified her as an "I-58-class" submarine. At dawn,  began to zigzag and Sea Devil began an approach for an attack position.

On 31 October 1944, the Imperial Japanese Navy declared  to be presumed lost with all hands. She was stricken from the Navy list on 10 December 1944.

Notes

Sources
 Hackett, Bob & Kingsepp, Sander.  IJN Submarine I-364: Tabular Record of Movement.  Retrieved on September 17, 2020.

Type D submarines
Ships built by Mitsubishi Heavy Industries
1944 ships
World War II submarines of Japan
Japanese submarines lost during World War II
Maritime incidents in September 1944
Ships lost with all hands
World War II shipwrecks in the Pacific Ocean
Submarines sunk by submarines
Ships sunk by American submarines